Avaux is a commune in the Ardennes department and Grand Est region of north-eastern France.

The inhabitants of the commune are known as Avalois or Avaloises.

The commune has been awarded two flowers by the National Council of Towns and Villages in Bloom in the Competition of cities and villages in Bloom.

Geography
Avaux is located some 22 km west by south-west of Rethel and 38 km south-east of Laon. Access to the commune is by the D523 from Évergnicourt in the south-west which changes to the D137 at the border then continues to the village and north-east to join the D18 south-west of Saint-Germainmont. The D966 forms the western border of the commune as it goes south from Lor to Evergnicourt. Apart from thin strips of forest along the eastern and southern borders the commune is entirely farmland.

The Canal latéral à l'Aisne forms the southern border of the commune and the Aisne river forms the eastern border then runs through the south of the commune parallel to the canal as it flows west to eventually join the Seine at Conflans-Sainte-Honorine.

Neighbouring communes and villages

Heraldry

Administration

List of Successive Mayors

Demography
In 2017 the commune had 466 inhabitants.

Sites and monuments
Avaux was once called Asfeld-le-Château as it was the seat of a fortified house of the Counts of Avaux. The chateau has disappeared.

The Church of Notre-Dame contains a Painting: the Nativity of the Virgin (18th century), which is registered as an historical object.

Notable people linked to the commune
Claude de Mesmes, Count of Avaux (1595-1650), diplomat and man of letters.
Jean-Jacques de Mesmes, Count of Avaux: best known for developing the town of Asfeld.
Yves Gibeau, his family came from Avaux and he lived in the commune during part of his youth.

See also
Communes of the Ardennes department

References

External links

Avaux on the 1750 Cassini Map

Communes of Ardennes (department)